Peabody Hall is a historic site in Gainesville, Florida, United States. It is located in the northeastern section of the University of Florida. On June 27, 1979, it was added to the U.S. National Register of Historic Places. It currently houses the Dean of Students Office and the Counseling Center at the university.

Namesake

Peabody Hall is named after George Peabody, an influential investment banker and known to some as the founder of modern philanthropy.

See also
University of Florida
Buildings at the University of Florida
Campus Historic District

References

External links
 Alachua County listings at National Register of Historic Places
 Alachua County listings at Florida's Office of Cultural and Historical Programs
 Virtual tour of University of Florida Campus Historic District at Alachua County's Department of Growth Management
 The University of Florida Historic Campus at UF Facilities Planning & Construction
 George A. Smathers Libraries
 UF Builds: The Architecture of the University of Florida
 Peabody Hall

National Register of Historic Places in Gainesville, Florida
Buildings at the University of Florida
William Augustus Edwards buildings
University and college buildings on the National Register of Historic Places in Florida
1913 establishments in Florida
University and college buildings completed in 1913